Enion is an unincorporated community in Fulton County, Illinois, United States. Enion is located on Illinois Route 100 south of Lewistown.

References

Unincorporated communities in Fulton County, Illinois
Unincorporated communities in Illinois